Zheng Saisai was the defending champion, but chose not to participate.

Kristýna Plíšková won the title after her opponent Misa Eguchi retired in the third set with the score at 7–5, 4–6, 2–5r.

Seeds

Main draw

Finals

Top half

Bottom half

References 
 Main draw
 Qualifying draw

Dalian Women's Tennis Open - Singles
2016 Singles
2016 in Chinese tennis